Karvetinagar or Karvetinagaram is a village in Chittoor district in the Indian state of Andhra Pradesh. It is the headquarters of Karvetinagar mandal. The town is known for Venugopalaswamy Temple, that was constructed during the reign of Venkataraja dynasty.

Geography
It has an average elevation of 252 meters.

Connectivity 

The nearest railway station is Puttur ( distant) in Andhra Pradesh. Some express trains stop here.  Frequent buses run from Puttur to Chittoor via Karvetinagar or from Pallipattu in Tamil Nadu. The nearest international airport is at Chennai (115 km), and Renigunta (Tirupati) (45 km) away.

History 

Karvetinagar was a former zamindar, most prominent during the Vijayanagara Empire. The Bommaraju family trace their origins back to an ancestor who migrated from the Pithapuram area of the Godavari Delta in the 8th or 9th century. One ancestor obtained the favor of the Eastern Chalukya king Vimala Aditya, and Saluva Narasa was appointed the chief of the country around Tirupati, where he founded his capital called Narayanavanam. The rulers later built their new capital, Nagaram, here by clearing the forest. Narasa was granted permission by his patron to use the royal seal and boar-signet of the Chalukyas, a proud distinction still kept up. At one point Saluva Venkatapati was deposed by the Cholas, but Saluva Bhima recovered their territory. Saluva Narsimha assisted a Keralan king named Kirti Varman and assumed independence, ruling for 36 years. Saluva Bhujanga was defeated and became a feudal of Western Chalukya king Someswara and was taken prisoner to Kalyan, where he died. Subsequent descendants recovered the estate, and in 1230 AD a part of the estate was taken over by Raja Raja Chola the second, of the Chola dynasty. During the next four generations, as the power of the Cholas declined, the fortunes of the Karvetinagar family rose, the family became feudatories of Vijayanagar, and had marriage alliances with the Saluva and loyalties to the Aravidu dynasty over the next two hundred years. Around the 16th century the family changed their name to the current Bommaraju, retaining Saluva as a title. After Bommaraju, prominent among their dynasty are Raja Kumara Venkataperumal Raja Bahadur, last ruler of the erstwhile zamindar of Karvetinagar. After his death without any issues in 1940, his brother Raja Kumara Kumaraswamy Raja was confirmed with the rajah title and became the First M.L.A of Puttur. He donated Lashmi Mahal Palace for use as a Government High School, at present a junior college and degree college located in the same palace premises. He died without issues in 1952. After his death his co-brother Raja Kumara Srinivasa Varma's Son Raja Kumara Venkata Perumal Rajah, alias Raja Kumara Janardhana Varma, was confirmed as rajah by then presidency of the Madras Government. As a holder of the Rajah title he was honored by the temple's management of constructed karvetinagar rajah's, like Sri Arulmugu Subramanya Swamy Temple Tiruttani, Sri Lashmi Narasimhaswami Temple Sholingur, Sri Kalyana Venkateswara swamy Temple Narayanavanam, Sri Prasanna Venkateswara Swamy Temple Appalayagunta and Sri Venugopala Swamy Temple karvetinagar etc. during his lifetime. He died in the year 2008. He has two sons, Raja Kumara Bramha Raja Varma (alias Srikanth Varma) and Raja Kumara Harsha Vardhana Varma at present they are the heirs of Karvetinagar Zamindary and currently residing at Karveti Nagaram.

References 

Mandal headquarters in Chittoor district
Princely states of India